The CRH3 Hexie (simplified Chinese: 和谐号; traditional Chinese: 和諧號; pinyin: Héxié Hào; literally: "Harmony") is a version of the Siemens Velaro high-speed train used in China on the Beijing–Tianjin intercity railway line, Wuhan-Guangzhou Passenger Dedicated Line, Zhengzhou-Xi'an Passenger Dedicated Line and the Shanghai–Nanjing intercity railway.

Variants
In November 2005, the Ministry of Railways ordered 60 Velaro trains for use on the Beijing–Tianjin intercity railway line.  On 27 July 2006, the joint project office was opened at Tangshan.

CRH3C Prototypes
These trains are based on the German Deutsche Bahn's ICE 3 high-speed trains and were given initial designations of CRH3A. Of these German trains, the first one was shipped from Bremerhaven on 19 December 2007.

The first train was rolled out on 3 June 2013.

CRH3C
After December 2008, the three imported CRH3A were repainted and renamed to CRH3C (CRH3-002C, CRH3-003C and CRH3-004C).
The rest of the trains are now being built by Tangshan Railway Vehicle with some components from Germany.

The first Chinese-built CRH3 (CRH3-001C) was unveiled on 11 April 2008.

The 8-car CRH3C trains are similar to the Velaro E design in Spain, but  wider to fit more seats in a 2+3 layout; a  CRH3 train will seat 572 passengers: 16 deluxe-class (8 sold publicly), 56 in first-class, 528 in second-class.

Each train sets consists of four motor cars and four trailer cars, equipped with two driving units, and each of them is in charge of the driving of two motor cars and two trailer cars.

The bogies are improved versions of the SF500 bogie. Innovations include the body bolster, vibration damper, spring parameters, transmission ratio, widening the carbody and increasing the speed of the trainsets.

On 24 June 2008, CRH3-001C reached a top speed of  during a test on the Beijing to Tianjin high speed line.

On 9 December 2009, a pair of CRH3 EMUs (CRH3-013C + CRH3-017C) reached a top speed of  during a test on the Zhengzhou to Xi'an high speed line, setting a world record for double-link EMUs.

On 28 September 2009, an additional 20 CRH3C sets was ordered by the Chinese MOR.

CRH380B/BL

In March 2009, a new contract was signed with China Northern Railways (CNR) to supply 100 16-car trainsets for 39.2B RMB with delivery from October 2010 onwards.
This order for a total of 1600 railway cars is greater than the total production of all Velaro and ICE trains that have ever been manufactured in the past.
It is planned that the trains will be produced by CNR subsidiaries, Tangshan Railway Vehicle and Changchun Railway Vehicles, using technology from the previous technology transfer agreement. In this contract, Siemens acts as a component supplier, with 85% of the content actually made by the company. An additional order for 40 16-car sets and 40 8-car sets was made on 28 September 2009 for 25.32B RMB.

These trains have been designated as CRH380B (8-car set) and CRH380BL (16-car set) in September 2010. The first CRH380BL set with series number CRH380B-6401L rolled off the production line and was unveiled to the public in September 2010. it was manufactured by Tangshan Railway Vehicle. In October 2010, the 16-car train was sent to Beijing loop line for test. In November 2010, the train was sent to Beijing-Shanghai High-Speed Railway for trial run.

Since 13 January 2011, the CRH380BL enter regular service at the Shanghai–Hangzhou High-Speed Railway and Shanghai–Nanjing High-Speed Railway.

All 54 CRH380BL trainsets were recalled in mid-August 2011 due to operational problems on the new Beijing–Shanghai High-Speed Railway. The new trains were reported as being "too sensitive" and the subject of frequent breakdowns in stormy weather. They were temporarily replaced by the CRH380A and CRH380AL. The recalled trainsets returned to service in December 2011,  .

CRH380CL

CRH380CL is a modified CRH380BL with a redesigned nose and electrical equipment from Hitachi. 25 16-car trainsets have been ordered by the MOR, replacing 25 previously ordered CRH380BL units. The first trainset was delivered and underwent testing in 2011. The trains entered regular service in the Spring of 2013.

CRH3A

The CRH3A is based on CJ1 (which in itself is derived from the CRH380B/BL/CL) and CRH5. The first sets where unveiled for public service on 6 December 2017 on the Xi'an–Chengdu HSR which opened a few days later.

CRH3X 
A prototype highspeed train being developed at CRRC Tangshan capable of cars in a trainset to be swapped out according to demand. Trains can be adjusted to be between 2 and 16 cars long with capability to swap in double deck passenger cars, restaurant and freight cars according to demand.

Formation
Power Destination
 M – Motor car
 T – Trailer car
 C – Driver cabin
 P – Pantograph

Coach Type
 SW – Business Class Coach
 ZY – First Class Coach
 ZE – Second Class Coach
 CA – Buffet Car
 ZEC – Second Class Coach／Buffet Car
 ZES – Second Class／Business Coach
 ZYS – First Class／Business Coach
 ZYG – First Class Coach／Sightseeing Car
 ZET – Second Class Coach／Premier Coach
 ZYT – First Class Coach／Premier Coach

CRH3C 

 Train No. 3001～3080

CRH380B 

 Train No. 3571～3731, 3738～3754, 5637～5681, 5730～5761, 5787～5802, 5829～5888

CRH380BG 

 Train No. 5546～5585
 Train No. 5586～5600, 5626～5636, 5684～5729, 5762～5786, 5803～5822

CRH380BL 

 Train No. 3501～3543, 5501～5545
 Train No. 3544～3570, 3732～3737, 5823～5828

CRH380CL

 Train No. 5601
 Train No. 5602～5625

Distribution 
As of August 2017, there are 80 CRH3C series EMU, 661 CRH380B series EMU and 25 CRH380C series EMU in service.

Accidents and incidents
On 25 January 2018 the train number G284/281 from Qingdao railway station to Hangzhou East railway station, served by CRH380BL-5522 (staffed by Jinan Railway Bureau) was forced to make an emergency stop at Dingyuan railway station due to a fire on one of the main transformers installed in Coach 2 (ZY 552202). Some 1400 passengers were evacuated, while the car affected by the fire has been completely burnt out. No injuries or casualties were reported.

See also
 China Railway High-speed
 China Railway CRH1
 China Railway CRH2
 China Railway CRH5
 China Railway CRH380A
 China Railway CRH6
 China Railway CIT trains
 ICE 3
 Siemens Velaro
 Bombardier Zefiro
 List of high-speed trains

References

External links

 Official CRH3A Model Train
 Official CRH380CL Model Train
 Inside and outside CRH3C China Rail High Speed Train

CRH3
Siemens multiple units
Electric multiple units of China
Siemens Velaro
Passenger trains running at least at 350 km/h in commercial operations
Changchun Railway Vehicles
CRRC Tangshan
Passenger trains running at least at 200 km/h in commercial operations
Passenger trains running at least at 250 km/h in commercial operations
Articles containing video clips
CRRC multiple units
25 kV AC multiple units